Morafic (1956-1974) was a gray Arabian stallion foaled in Egypt and later imported to the United States by Gleannloch Farms. Morafic was sired by Nazeer and out of Mabrouka.
Morafic sired 58 foals in Egypt and 151 in the US, of which 30 became US and Canadian National show winners. Morafic was the leading imported Egyptian sire of national winners during his lifetime.

Pedigree

References

Individual Arabian and part-Arabian horses